A-CLUB, short for Anime-club, was a popular magazine in Hong Kong in the 1980s.  Its main topic include Japanese anime, manga and the Japanese video game industry.  It also covered some aspect of Hong Kong manhua, and eventually US comics in the later years.  It ceased publications in 2001.

Operation
Prior to the internet age in the 1980s and early 1990s, the magazine was one of the main source for Japanese anime culture materials in Hong Kong.  The cover usually feature the hottest topics at the time.

The founding price was HK$10 per issue, it later increased to HK$35.

In its final year the magazine was only able to sell about 3,000 copies.

See also 

 List of manga magazines published outside of Japan

References

1986 establishments in Hong Kong
2001 disestablishments in Hong Kong
Biweekly magazines published in Hong Kong
Chinese-language magazines (Traditional Chinese)
Defunct magazines published in Hong Kong
Magazines established in 1986
Magazines disestablished in 2001